Spiral Dance is an Adelaide-based Pagan folk rock band whose musical focus is on the concepts of magic, myth and legend.

Fusing folk-lore and legend with a good heady serve of pagan mystery, Spiral Dance presents an eclectic blend of traditional English folk-rock with powerful self-penned songs and tunes. Rousing melodies intertwine with mythical tales that will spirit you into the realms of magic and the mists of ancient time – this is music that will rock your ancestors! 

The band was formed in 1992 as a project to explore some of the more mystical elements in life and has drawn its energy from the songwriting and vocal skills of Adrienne Piggott. Adrienne's lyrics are supported by guitar and button accordion, underpinned with bass and percussion, all arranged to blend acoustic folk-rock with Celtic harmony.

To date, the band has released nine albums along with appearing on the Green Album and toured extensively in Australia, the United States and the United Kingdom.  Highlights include playing concerts with Damh the Bard, Witchfest International, Glastonbury Faerie Ball, The Mercian Gathering and numerous shows throughout the United Kingdom.

Current band line-up 

 Adrienne Piggott : vocals
 Nick Carter : guitar/vocals
 Paul Gooding : button accordion/vocals
 Paul Angus : drums/percussion
 Nigel Walters : bass guitar

Discography 

 Woman of the Earth (1996)
 Over the Nine Waves (1997)
 Magick (1999)
 Notes of Being (2002)
 The Quickening (2006)
 Live - Worts 'n' All (2007)
 From The Mist, A Retrospective (2010)
 Through A Sylvan Doorway (2012)
 Wickerman - single release (2014)
 The Green Album (2016)
 Land and Legend (2017)

Promotional singles

 Spirit of the Green - from The Green Album (2016)

References

External links 
 
  Facebook
  Myspace

Australian folk rock groups
Modern pagan musical groups
Modern paganism in Australia